Aymaramyia is a genus of crane fly, Tipuloidea, in the family Limoniidae. There is only one known species.

Distribution
Peru

Species
Aymaramyia dubia Alexander, 1943

References

Limoniidae
Nematocera genera
Monotypic Diptera genera